Chernivtsi is a city in Ukraine on the Prut River in the eponymous oblast and raion in Bukovina.

Chernivtsi may also refer to:

Places
 Chernivtsi Raion, Chernivtsi Oblast, Bukovina, Ukraine; a district containing the eponymous city in the eponymous province 
 Chernivtsi Oblast, Bukovina, Ukraine; a province containing the eponymous district and eponymous city
 Chernivtsi, Vinnytsia Oblast, Podolia, Ukraine; a town in the eponymous raion
 Chernivtsi Raion, Vinnytsia Oblast, Podolia, Ukraine; a district containing the eponymous town
 Chernivtsi District (1775–1849), Galicia and Lodomeria, Hapsburg Empire

 Ukrainian Catholic Eparchy of Chernivtsi (bishopric), Archeparchy of Ivano-Frankivsk, Ukraine

Facilities and structures
 Chernivtsi International Airport, Chernivtsi, Chernivtsi Raion, Chernivtsi Oblast, Ukraine

Other uses
 Chernivtsi University, Chernivtsi, Chernivtsi Raion, Chernivtsi Oblast, Ukraine

See also

 Proskurov-Chernivtsi Offensive, WWII
 Chernivtsi Raion (disambiguation)
 
 Chernihiv (disambiguation)
 Yemima Avidar-Tchernovitz